The Angolan Handball Federation (Federação Angolana de Andebol or simply FAAND) is the governing body of official handball competitions in Angola. FAAND was founded on May 20, 1974, still in the heat of the anti-colonial struggle, when a group of nationalists decided to establish the federation. On May 20, every year, the National Handball Day is celebrated, to mark the day that for the first time, a handball tournament was organized in Angola. However, only in 1976 it officially began to operate. Mr. Francisco António de Almeida was appointed as chairman. FAB oversees the activities of the 18 provincial handball associations in the country.

On an annual basis, the federation organizes the men's national championship, the women's championship as well as the Angolan Cup and Super Cup, including in the lower age categories. It also oversees the provincial championships organized by the related basketball associations and the participation of national squads in African and worldwide events.

Africa Palmarès (national squad)
Women

Men

Participation in world events (Women)

National Champions
Women

Men

Angola Cup Winners
Women

Men

Angola Super Cup Winners
Women

Men

Africa Palmarès (clubs)

Women

Men

Chairman history

Former head coaches

See also
 Angola Women's Handball League
 Angola Men's Handball League

References

External links
 

Sports governing bodies in Angola
Sports organizations established in 1974
Handball governing bodies